Ninemilehouse, historically called Killcullen  is a village in County Tipperary, Ireland. It lies on the N76 national secondary road at its junction with the R690 regional road.

Ninemilehouse is on the border with County Kilkenny, on a pass through the eastern foothills of Slievenamon. It derives its name from the fact that it is nine Irish miles (18 km; 11 statute miles) along  Glenbower along the turnpike road.

References

See also
List of towns and villages in Ireland

Towns and villages in County Tipperary